Eleutherodactylus diplasius, the patternless whistling frog, is a species of frog in the family Eleutherodactylidae. A native of Haiti, it can be found in the Tiburon Peninsula northwest, to the Massif de la Hotte. It has an estimated polygon range of ca. 814 km2, spanning an elevational range of 0–1,207 m asl.  In July 2011 it was found in at Morne Deux Mamelles.

References

diplasius
Endemic fauna of Haiti
Amphibians of Haiti
Taxa named by Albert Schwartz (zoologist)
Amphibians described in 1973